Aucilla is an unincorporated community and census-designated place (CDP) in Jefferson County, Florida, United States, located near the intersection of county roads 158 and 257. As of the 2020 census, the population was 103.

Geography
Aucilla is located in eastern Jefferson County at 30°29'N 83°45′W (30.480,-83.754).

Education
Jefferson County Schools operates public schools, including Jefferson County Middle / High School.

Demographics

References

Unincorporated communities in Jefferson County, Florida
Tallahassee metropolitan area
Unincorporated communities in Florida
Former municipalities in Florida
Census-designated places in Florida